The Pacific sierra (Scomberomorus sierra) also known as the Mexican sierra, is a ray-finned bony fish in the family Scombridae, better known as the mackerel family.  More specifically, this fish is a member of the tribe Scomberomorini, the Spanish mackerels. It occurs in the eastern Pacific Ocean from southern California to Antofagasta in Chile.

References

External links
 

Taxa named by David Starr Jordan
Taxa named by Edwin Chapin Starks
Fish described in 1895
Scomberomorus